Antenucci is an Italian surname that is a variant of Antonucci. Notable people with the surname include:

Alfred Antenucci, American labor official who intervened in the Reagan assassination attempt
Joseph Antenucci Becherer (born 1965), American curator, professor, writer, and arts administrator
Mirco Antenucci (born 1984), Italian footballer

See also

Antonucci

Notes

Italian-language surnames